Ondrej Sobola (7 August 1880 – officially 31 December 1918) was an Austro-Hungarian Army soldier. His death, in an unknown place during the First World War, inspired the Tree of Peace project.

Biography 
Sobola was born on 7 August 1880 in Lalinok into a farmer family. His family had lived in the area since 1512. He was conscripted into the army in 1901. Sobola and his older brother Štefan travelled to the United States around 1906, residing in Clifton Heights, Pennsylvania. Sobola returned to Lalinok in 1907, living there for three years, and again traveled to the United States on 30 November 1910. 

Sobola had returned to Lalinok by 1914. After the outbreak of the First World War, he enlisted in the 15th Military Infantry Regiment. He was listed as missing in action on the Eastern Front in 1915. Sobola was one of those commemorated by his home village in a memorial to First World War dead on 11 November 2018. His portrait made by sculptor Michal Janiga is also incorporated on a Memorial. His name is on a Memorial pillar in the Emperor's park of Kaiservilla in Bad Ischl.

Tree of Peace 
The Tree of Peace is an international project that originated in Slovakia. The project, created in 2018 on the centenary of the end of World War I, was initiated by landscape architect Marek Sobola, Ondrej's great-grandson. The grave of Sobola has not been found after many years of historical searching in Military archives across Europe. His great-grandfather's death inspired Sobola to memorialize the soldiers who died in the First World War in unknown places without their names or identities. The main goal of the project was to promote a message of peace by planting "Trees of Peace" on every continent.

See also
List of people who disappeared

References 

1880 births
1910s missing person cases
1918 deaths
Austro-Hungarian military personnel killed in World War I
Missing in action of World War I